Parachaeturichthys is a genus of gobies native to deep waters of the Indian Ocean and the western Pacific Ocean.

Species
There are currently two recognized species in this genus:
 Parachaeturichthys ocellatus (F. Day, 1873)
 Parachaeturichthys polynema (Bleeker, 1853) (Taileyed goby)

References

Gobiidae